This was the first edition of the tournament.

Pedro Sousa won the title after defeating Alessandro Giannessi 6–3, 7–6(7–3) in the final.

Seeds

Draw

Finals

Top half

Bottom half

External Links
Main Draw
Qualifying Draw

Internazionali di Tennis d'Abruzzo - Singles
Internazionali di Tennis d'Abruzzo